Adrian Barone (born 5 May 1987) is a New Zealand rugby union footballer who plays as a prop for the Hawke's Bay Magpies in the ITM Cup. His performances at domestic level have seen him named in the  Wider Training Squad for the 2013 Super Rugby season.

References

External links 
Adrian Barone itsrugby.co.uk Player Statistics

Living people
1987 births
New Zealand rugby union players
Rugby union props
Hawke's Bay rugby union players
Wellington rugby union players
Manawatu rugby union players